The First United Methodist Church in Prestonburg, Kentucky is a historic church.

It was listed on the National Register of Historic Places as Methodist Episcopal Church, South in 1989.  It is a historic Methodist church building on S. Arnold Avenue between Ford Street and W. Graham Street in Prestonsburg, Kentucky.

It was built in 1917 in a Late Gothic Revival style.  It is a brick building with yellow sandstone trim on a raised concrete block foundation.  The brick is glazed with a yellow-orange mottled finish and is laid in running bond.

See also
National Register of Historic Places listings in Floyd County, Kentucky

References

External links
, First United Methodist Church

Churches on the National Register of Historic Places in Kentucky
Gothic Revival church buildings in Kentucky
Churches completed in 1917
20th-century Methodist church buildings
United Methodist churches in Kentucky
National Register of Historic Places in Floyd County, Kentucky
1917 establishments in Kentucky
Prestonsburg, Kentucky